Piroska "Piri" Vaszary (19 May 1901 in Budapest – 2 October 1965 in Palma de Mallorca, Spain) was a Hungarian film actress.

Life

Family 
Her father was Gábor Vaszary (born in Kaposvár, on 13 March 1866) main-notar of Budapest, her mother was Auguszta Csipka. Her brothers were Gábor Vaszary (or Gábor von Vaszary) (7 June 1897 in Budapest – 22 May 1985) a Hungarian novelist and screenwriter, who emigrated to Switzerland and Johann von Vásáry or János Vaszary (1899–1963) a Hungarian actor, screenwriter, playwright and film director, Lili Muráti's husband. Her uncle was János Vaszary (30 November 1867 – 19 April 1939) a Hungarian painter and graphic artist. Her grand-grandfather's half-brother was Kolos Ferenc Vaszary, O.S.B. (12 February 1832 in Keszthely, Hungary – 3 September 1915 in Balatonfüred, Hungary) a cardinal of the Roman Catholic Church, archbishop of Esztergom.

Career 
She has been close her studies in Szidi Rákosi's Academy of Theatre in 1920. After she played in a lot of theatres in Budapest. In the end of 1944 she emigrated to Austria, after to Germany. She lived in France, in Spain, in Argentina, in Venezuela and in Canada. From 1948 until 1954 played in Argentinian Hungarian Society of Theater, in 1959 also in Venezuela.

She has already starred in silent films, "The Miracle Doctor" and "The Lady of the East," as well as in an audio film initiative, "Laughing Lady." He became a constant comedian in Hungarian films. She shaped her roles with exceptional caricature. She also appeared in the German film "Spring Parade" in 1935. She was also popular with her cabaret couples. She has appeared in many audio films.

Private life 
She has been married three times. In 1924 Andor Feld married an industrial boss, from whom she divorced in 1926. Her second husband Árpád Horváth became the director of National Theatre (Budapest) in 1929 from whom he also divorced in 1932. Thirdly, she married the physician Endre Bodócsy (in Budapest, Erzsébetváros, on 14 June 1932). They had two children, Piroska (26 April 1933) and in 1942 Endre.

Selected filmography
 1934 Spring Parade
 1937 Mother
 1938 Rozmaring
 1940 Seven Plum Trees
 Duel for Nothing
 1941 Shako and Hat
 1942 Magdolna
 Dr. Kovács István
 1943 Kerek Ferkó (1943)
 Orient Express
 1944 Afrikai vőlegény
 Wildfire

Bibliography
 Simon, Andrew L. Made in Hungary: Hungarian Contributions to Universal Culture. Simon Publications, 1998.

References

External links

1901 births
1965 deaths
Hungarian film actresses
Hungarian silent film actresses
Actresses from Budapest
20th-century Hungarian actresses